Federica Bilardo (born 6 July 1999) is an Italian professional tennis player.

Bilardo has career-high WTA rankings of 537 in singles, achieved December 2022, and 425 in doubles, reached in July 2019.

She made her WTA Tour main-draw debut at the 2019 Palermo Ladies Open in the doubles tournament, partnering Dalila Spiteri.

ITF Circuit finals

Singles: 12 (3 titles, 9 runner-ups)

Doubles: 9 (5 titles, 4 runner-ups)

References

External links
 
 

1999 births
Living people
Italian female tennis players
21st-century Italian women